Nazakat Mammadova (February 28, 1944, Ganja - October 21, 1980, Sochi) was an Azerbaijani singer. She started her career in the Lale girls musical group and between 1970 and 1980 she was with the  Azerbaijan State Academic Opera and Ballet Theater. She sang folk music as well as mugham.

References

20th-century Azerbaijani women singers
1944 births
1981 deaths
Musicians from Ganja, Azerbaijan